Gershuni is a surname. Notable people with the surname include:

Grigory Gershuni (1870–1908), Lithuanian revolutionary
Moshe Gershuni (1936–2017), Israeli painter and sculptor
Uri Gershuni (born 1970), Israeli photographer and educator
Vladimir Gershuni (1930–1994), Soviet dissident and poet